= Ordinary Organizations =

2014 book by Stefan Kühl

- First English edition (2016)
- Author: Stefan Kühl
- Original title: Ganz normale Organisationen. Zur Soziologie des Holocaust
- Translator: Jessica Spengler
- Language: German
- Publication date: 2014

Ordinary Organizations: Why Normal Men Carried Out the Holocaust is a book by German sociologist Stefan Kühl. It was originally published in German, as Ganz normale Organisationen. Zur Soziologie des Holocaust, in 2014. It was translated into English by Jessica Spengler in 2016.
